Byron Marshall (born February 13, 1994) is an American football running back who is currently a free agent. He was most recently a member of the Ottawa Redblacks of the Canadian Football League (CFL). He played college football at Oregon, and was signed by the Philadelphia Eagles as an undrafted free agent in 2016. Marshall has also been a member of the Washington Redskins, Buffalo Bills, Baltimore Ravens and Hamilton Tiger-Cats.

Early years
Marshall attended Valley Christian High School in San Jose, California, where he was a three-sport star in football, track, and basketball. He was a four-year letterman in football. He rushed for 914 yards and nine touchdowns his senior year, averaging 9.38 yards per carry, and caught seven passes for 86 yards and one score despite missing three games due to injury. He was named to the all-Mercury News’ second-team. He carried the ball 145 times for 1,360 yards and 20 touchdowns as a junior, as well as catching 10 passes for 115 yards, to be selected to the all-Central Coast first-team. He had a break-out year as a sophomore, rushing for 1,035 yards and 17 touchdowns, while catching 11 passes for 331 yards and four more scores. He was the Cal-Hi Sports State Sophomore of the Year and was a first-team Central Coast choice and West Coast Athletic League pick. As a freshman in 2008, he was intercepted by Mitchell Loquaci in the CCS championship game. He also played in the 2012 Army All-America game. Marshall finished his high school career with 3,386 rushing yards and 57 total touchdowns, both school records.

Also a standout in track & field, Marshall was ranked first among sophomores in California with a time of 10.61 seconds in the 100-meter dash. He placed third place at the National Indoor Championships at 60-meter dash with a time of 6.85 second. He also ran a 4.77-second 40-meter dash and squatted 455 pounds.

College career

Marshall played for Oregon from 2012 to 2015. As a freshman in 2012, he had 87 carries for 447 rushing yards and four rushing touchdowns. As a sophomore in 2013, he became Oregon's 20th 1,000-yard rusher (with 1,038), finishing fifth in the Pac-12 in rushing (with 86.5 yards per game) in 2013. Against UCLA, he gained 133 yards with three touchdowns to cap five straight games rushing over the century mark. As a junior in 2014, Marshall finished the year with 1,003 yards receiving on 74 catches. He became the first player in conference history to ever rush for 1,000 yards and also accumulate 1,000 receiving yards in his collegiate career. The Ducks leading receiver also came up big in the national championship, where he grabbed eight receptions for 169 yards and one touchdown. As a senior, Marshall missed all but the first four games of 2015 with a leg injury, accumulating 121 yards and two touchdowns on nine catches.

Collegiate statistics

Professional career

Philadelphia Eagles
Marshall went undrafted in the 2016 NFL Draft and signed with the Philadelphia Eagles. On September 3, 2016, he was released by the Eagles. The next day, he was signed to the Eagles' practice squad. He was promoted to the active roster on December 13, 2016. On December 18, he made his NFL debut against the Baltimore Ravens with nine carries for 22 rushing yards. Overall, in the 2016 season, he appeared in three games and had 19 carries for 64 rushing yards.

On September 2, 2017, Marshall was waived by the Eagles, and was signed to the practice squad the following day.

Washington Redskins
On November 14, 2017, Marshall was signed by the Washington Redskins off the Eagles' practice squad. After suffering a hamstring injury in the Week 14 loss to the Los Angeles Chargers, he was placed on injured reserve on December 12, 2017. He finished the 2017 season with nine carries for 32 yards and six receptions for 36 yards in four games.

On September 5, 2018, Marshall was placed on injured reserve with an ankle injury. He was activated from injured reserve on November 17, 2018, after an injury to Samaje Perine. In the 2018 season, he had three carries for nine yards, along with four receptions for 30 yards in six games. Marshall was waived on September 1, 2019, after the team had claimed running back Wendell Smallwood off waivers.

Buffalo Bills
The Buffalo Bills signed Marshall to their practice squad on September 3, 2019. He was released on October 8.

Baltimore Ravens
On November 6, 2019, Marshall was signed to the Baltimore Ravens practice squad. His practice squad contract with the team expired on January 20, 2020.

Hamilton Tiger-Cats
Marshall signed with the Hamilton Tiger-Cats of the CFL on February 11, 2021. He was released by the Ti-Cats on July 29, 2021, as part of the team's final roster cuts.

Ottawa Redblacks 
Marshall signed with the Ottawa Redblacks of the CFL on March 18, 2022. He was released as part of the team's final roster cuts on June 4, 2022.

Personal life
Marshall is the younger brother of running back Cameron Marshall.

References

External links
 Oregon Ducks bio
 Washington Redskins bio

1994 births
Living people
American football running backs
American football wide receivers
Baltimore Ravens players
Buffalo Bills players
Hamilton Tiger-Cats players
Oregon Ducks football players
Philadelphia Eagles players
Players of American football from San Jose, California
Washington Redskins players